Cochylidia richteriana is a moth of the family Tortricidae. It was described by Josef Emanuel Fischer von Röslerstamm in 1837. It is found from central and northern Europe to Mongolia, China (Beijing, Hebei, Heilongjiang, Hunan, Inner Mongolia, Liaoning, Ningxia, Qinghai, Shandong, Shanxi, Sichuan, Tianjin), the Russian Far East (Shilka, Minussinsk, Amur), Korea and Japan.

The wingspan is 15–17 mm. Adults have been recorded on wing from April to August.

The larvae feed on Artemisia campestris and Achillea millefolium.

References

 "Cochylidia richteriana (Fischer v. Roslerstamm, 1837)". Insecta.pro. Retrieved February 5, 2020.

Moths described in 1837
Cochylini
Moths of Europe